The Bangor Air Defense Sector (BaADS) is an inactive United States Air Force organization.  Its last assignment was with the Air Defense Command 26th Air Division, being stationed at Topsham Air Force Station, Maine.  It was inactivated on 1 April 1966.

History
BaADS was established in January 1957 assuming control of former ADC Eastern Air Defense Force units with a mission to provide air defense of Maine and most of Vermont and New Hampshire.  The organization provided command and control over several aircraft and radar squadrons.

On 1 March 1959 the new Semi Automatic Ground Environment (SAGE) Direction Center (DC-05) became operational.    DC-15 was equipped with dual AN/FSQ-7 Computers.   The day-to-day operations of the command was to train and maintain tactical flying units flying jet interceptor aircraft (F-94 Starfire; F-102 Delta Dagger; F-106 Delta Dart) in a state of readiness with training missions and series of exercises with SAC and other units simulating interceptions of incoming enemy aircraft.

The Sector was inactivated 1 April 1966 as part of ADC reorganization and consolidation, most units being reassigned to 26th Air Division.

Lineage
 Established as Bangor Air Defense Sector on 8 January 1957
 Inactivated on 1 April 1966

Assignments
 32d Air Division, 8 January 1957
 26th Air Division, 15 August 1958 – 1 April 1966

Stations
 Topsham AFS, Maine, 8 January 1957 – 1 April 1966

Components

Groups
 14th Fighter Group (Air Defense)
 Ethan Allen AFB, Vermont, 15 August 1958-25 June 1960
 23d Fighter Group (Air Defense)
 Presque Isle AFB, Maine, 15 August 1958-1 July 1959

Interceptor Squadrons
 27th Fighter-Interceptor Squadron
 Loring AFB, Maine, 1 October 1959-1 April 1966
 75th Fighter-Interceptor Squadron
 Dow AFB, Maine, 18 June 1959-1 April 1966

Missile Squadron
30th Air Defense Missile Squadron (BOMARC)
 Dow AFB, Maine, 1 June 1959-15 December 1964

Radar Squadrons

 654th Radar Squadron (SAGE)
 Brunswick AFS, Maine, 15 August 1958-1 August 1962
 672d Aircraft Control and Warning Squadron
 Barrington AS, Nova Scotia, 1 July 1960 – 1 June 1962
 764th Radar Squadron (SAGE)
 Saint Albans AFS, Vermont, 15 August 1958 – 1 June 1962
 765th Radar Squadron (SAGE)
 Charleston AFS, Maine, 15 August 1958 – 1 April 1966

 766th Radar Squadron (SAGE)
 Caswell AFS, Maine, 15 August 1958 – 1 April 1966
 907th Radar Squadron (SAGE)
 Bucks Harbor AFS, Maine, 15 August 1958 – 1 April 1966
 911th Radar Squadron (SAGE)
 Lyndonville AFS, Vermont, 15 August 1958 – 1 August 1962

See also
 List of USAF Aerospace Defense Command General Surveillance Radar Stations
 Aerospace Defense Command Fighter Squadrons

References

  A Handbook of Aerospace Defense Organization 1946–1980, by Lloyd H. Cornett and Mildred W. Johnson, Office of History, Aerospace Defense Center, Peterson Air Force Base, Colorado
 Winkler, David F. (1997), Searching the skies: the legacy of the United States Cold War defense radar program. Prepared for United States Air Force Headquarters Air Combat Command.
 Maurer, Maurer (1983). Air Force Combat Units of World War II. Maxwell AFB, Alabama: Office of Air Force History. .
 Ravenstein, Charles A. (1984). Air Force Combat Wings Lineage and Honors Histories 1947–1977. Maxwell AFB, Alabama: Office of Air Force History. .
 Radomes.org Bangor Air Defense Sector

External links
 Bangor Air Defense Sector SAGE facilities

Air Defense
Radar networks